Sonita Sutherland (born 9 July 1987 in Manchester) is a Jamaican 400 metres runner.

Her personal best is 51.13 seconds, achieved in April 2006.

International competitions

References
 

1987 births
Living people
People from Manchester Parish
Jamaican female sprinters
21st-century Jamaican women